Eldor Magomatovich Urazbayev (11 October 1940 – 21 February 2012) was a Soviet, Kazakhstani, and Russian film director, screenwriter and film producer. He was honored with the title, Honored Worker of Culture of the Russian Federation in 1998.

Biography
Urazbayev born 11 October 1940, Tashkent, Uzbek SSR. He graduated from the Physics and Mathematics MSU 1963 High Courses for Scriptwriters and Film Directors in Moscow, the studio Alov and Naumov in 1972.

Worked as an assistant director in the Shaken Aymanov at the studio  Kazakhfilm. After the tragic death Aymanova withdrew continuation of the acclaimed film Shaken  End of Ataman,  Trans-Siberian Express by script of  Adabashyan, Mikhalkov and Konchalovsky. For a successful movie everybody got the Kazakh SSR State Prize in 1978.

In 1982 he entered into a second marriage to actress Natalya Arinbasarova, which was shot in  Trans-Siberian Express.

Since 1982 as well   the head of the First Creative Association Gorky Film Studio, the 1987 a  art director of creative association TVK (TeleVideoKino) of the same studio. Since 1995 a   board member of Gorky Film Studio.

Awards and recognition
Winner of State Prize Kazakh SSR (1978) 
 Honored Worker of Culture of the Russian Federation (1998)

Filmography

Director
 1978 – Trans-Siberian Express
 1979 – Tailcoat for Scapegrace
 1981 – Look Both!
 1982 – Traffic Inspector
 1986 – One Second for a Feat
 1987 – Visit to Minotaur
 1993 – Tram hullabaloo or Buhtybarahty
 1994 – Hagi-Tragger
 2001 – Master of the Empire
 2002 – Female Logic
 2002 – Female Logic 2
 2003 – Children of own
 2004 – Wealth
 2006 – Varenka
 2009 – Bottlenose Jump

Actor
 1983 – Love. Waiting. Lena as  geologist 
 1995 – The Crusader as Ergen
 2001 – Boss Lady as Timur Khakimovich Kenzhitaev

Writer
 1990 – Hamlet of Suzaku, or Mamaia Caro
 1992 – Ariel

References

External links
 

Mass media people from Tashkent
1940 births
2012 deaths
Soviet film directors
Russian film directors
Kazakhstani film directors
Soviet screenwriters
20th-century Russian screenwriters
Male screenwriters
20th-century Russian male writers
Kazakhstani screenwriters
Soviet male actors
Russian male actors
Kazakhstani male actors
Russian film producers
Kazakhstani film producers
Moscow State University alumni
High Courses for Scriptwriters and Film Directors alumni
Deaths from cancer in Colorado
20th-century Russian male actors
Communist Party of the Soviet Union members